is a Japanese voice actress. She is affiliated with 81 Produce.

Filmography

Anime
Akuei to Gacchinpo (Akuei)
Bakkyuu HIT! Crash Bedaman (Sabu Nishijima)
Bakusou Kyoudai Let's & Go WGP (Nieminen, Tamtam)
Cardcaptor Sakura: The Movie (Xuehua Li)
Duel Masters (Kintaro Nanba)
Harimogu Harry (Gaburinu)
Hyper Police (Sakura Bokuseiinmonzeninari)
If It's for My Daughter, I'd Even Defeat a Demon Lord (Old Woman Venn)
Key the Metal Idol (Beniko Komori, Miho Utsuse)
Legend of Himiko (Kiyomizu)
MegaMan NT Warrior (CutMan, BubbleMan)
Midnight Horror School (Ampoo, Tubee)
Nodame Cantabile TV (Kazuo (Puri Gorota - episode 7))
Nodame Cantabile live action (Kazuo (Puri Gorota - episode 4))
Outlaw Star (Iraga)
Paranoia Agent (unnamed character in episode 3)
Petite Princess Yucie (Kobold)
Pikachu's Summer Vacation (Karakara)
Pilot Candidate (Kyoko Farley)
Pokémon (Fushigidane, Karakara)
Pokémon: Mewtwo Returns (Scientist)
Pokémon: The First Movie (miscellaneous voices)
Rockman.EXE Axess (BubbleMan)
Tokyo Godfathers (Eriko Kawasaki)

Video games
Bakusou Kyoudai Let's & Go!! Eternal Wings (Nieminen)
Klonoa Beach Volleyball (Chipple)

Dubbing

Live-action
West Side Story (2014 Wowow edition) (Anybodys (Susan Oakes))

Animation
Little Robots (Tiny)

References

External links
Official agency profile 

Living people
Voice actresses from Saitama Prefecture
Japanese video game actresses
Japanese voice actresses
81 Produce voice actors
Year of birth missing (living people)